The Apaturinae are a subfamily of butterflies that includes many species commonly called emperors.

Description
Strikingly-coloured, with cryptic underwing. A distinguishing character of the subfamily is the green proboscis.

Genera
Apaturinae consists of 20 genera and shows separate distributions and uncommon host–plant associations. Most genera of this subfamily are found throughout South-East Asia and Africa, whereas the genera Doxocopa and Asterocampa are spread mainly in South America and North America.

Apatura
Apaturina
Apaturopsis
Asterocampa
Chitoria
Dilipa
Doxocopa
Euapatura
Eulaceura
Euripus
Helcyra
Herona
Hestina
Hestinalis
Mimathyma
Rohana
Sasakia
Sephisa
Thaleropis
Timelaea

References

External links
Checklist Nearctic Nymphalidae List of North American species with images.
Pteron Images. In Japanese but with binomial names.

 
-
Butterfly subfamilies